William Pleydell-Bouverie, 7th Earl of Radnor,  (18 December 1895 – 23 November 1968) was a British peer.

Radnor was the son of Jacob Pleydell-Bouverie, 6th Earl of Radnor and Julian Eleanor Adelaide Balfour. His education was Harrow School, and later Trinity College, Cambridge.

He married, firstly, Helena Olivia Adeane, daughter of Charles Robert Whorwood Adeane and Madeline Pamela Constance Blanche Wyndham, on 11 October 1922 and had six children. He and Helena were divorced in 1942.

Lady Jane Pleydell-Bouverie (14 September 1923 – 21 July 2006), married Richard Anthony Bethell in 1945
Lady Belinda Pleydell-Bouverie (15 January 1925 – 1961)
Jacob Pleydell-Bouverie, 8th Earl of Radnor (10 November 1927 – 2008)
Hon. Reuben Pleydell-Bouverie (b. 30 December 1930)
Lady Phoebe Pleydell-Bouverie (b. 25 January 1932), who married Hubert Beaumont Phipps (1906–1969)
Lady Harriot Pleydell-Bouverie (b. 18 December 1935)

He married, secondly, Anne Isobel Graham Oakley, daughter of Lieutenant-Colonel Richard Oakley, on 9 October 1943 and had one child.

Hon. Richard Oakley Pleydell-Bouverie (b. 25 June 1947) who served as High Sheriff of Hertfordshire in 1998.

Radnor served as Governor of the French Hospital. Successive Earls of Radnor were governors of the hospital from the eighteenth century to 2015.

Note

Pleydell-Bouverie, William, 7th Earl of Radnor
Pleydell-Bouverie, William, 7th Earl of Radnor
Deputy Lieutenants of Wiltshire
Earls of Radnor
Knights of the Garter
Knights Commander of the Royal Victorian Order
High Sheriffs of Hertfordshire